Mani Bikram Shah (1967 – 14 May 2018) was a Nepalese footballer who played as a midfielder for, and captained, the national team, earning 48 caps between 1985 and 1998.

Honours
Nepal
 South Asian Games Gold medal: 1993; Silver medal: 1987

References

External links
 

1967 births
2018 deaths
Sportspeople from Kathmandu
Nepalese footballers
Association football midfielders
Nepal international footballers
Calcutta Football League players
South Asian Games medalists in football
South Asian Games gold medalists for Nepal
South Asian Games silver medalists for Nepal
Nepalese expatriate footballers
Nepalese expatriate sportspeople in India
Expatriate footballers in India